Gleaves is a (patronymic or paternal) family name. Variants of which include: Gleave, Glave and Glares.

Notable people with this surname (or similar) include:

Albert Gleaves (1858–1937), American admiral
Richard Howell Gleaves (1819–1907), American lawyer, merchant and politician
Sam Gleaves, English football manager
Nicholas Gleaves, English actor and playwright
Graeme Gleaves, British writer and railway historian
Alfred Gleave (1911–1999), Canadian politician
Lisa Gleave (born 1976), Australian model

See also
Gleaves-class destroyer